Protein phosphatase 1G is an enzyme that in humans is encoded by the PPM1G gene.

The protein encoded by this gene is a member of the PP2C family of Ser/Thr protein phosphatases. PP2C family members are known to be negative regulators of cell stress response pathways. This phosphatase is found to be responsible for the dephosphorylation of Pre-mRNA splicing factors, which is important for the formation of functional spliceosome. Studies of a similar gene in mice suggested a role of this phosphatase in regulating cell cycle progression. Alternatively spliced transcript variants encoding the same protein have been described.

References

Further reading